Pietro Scalvini (1718–1792) was an Italian painter of the late-Baroque and Neoclassic period, active in Brescia. He was inspired by Tiepolo and active in fresco painting of churches. His works include Sant'Apollonia Altarpiece.

Gallery

References

 Scalvini sur Wikipedia.it

1718 births
1792 deaths
18th-century Italian painters
Italian male painters
Painters from Brescia
18th-century Italian male artists